Correct the Record was a hybrid PAC/super PAC founded by David Brock. It supported Hillary Clinton's 2016 presidential campaign. The PAC aimed to respond to negative online narratives about Clinton.

History
The organization was created in May 2015 when it spun off from American Bridge 21st Century, another Democratic Super PAC. It coordinated with Clinton's 2016 U.S. presidential campaign via a loophole in campaign finance law that it says permits coordination with digital campaigns.

Purpose

In July 2015, Correct the Record teamed with Priorities USA Action, another pro-Clinton super PAC, to create a fundraising committee called American Priorities ’16.

In October 2015, historian Allida Black and political strategist Connor Shaw launched "Let's Talk Hillary" in partnership with Correct the Record and Wild Onion Media. The $1 million project was used to give Hillary Clinton's long time friends and co-workers a platform to describe the woman they knew. The project was largely considered a success and awarded numerous awards, including the Golden Donkey in 2015.

In April 2016, Correct the Record announced that it would be spending $1 million to find and confront social media users who post unflattering messages about Clinton in a "task force" called "Barrier Breakers 2016". In addition to this, the task force aimed to encourage Sanders supporters to support Clinton and to thank both "prominent supporters and committed superdelegates". The organization's president, Brad Woodhouse, said they had "about a dozen people engaged in [producing] nothing but positive content on Hillary Clinton" and had a team distributing information "particularly of interest to women". 

The Super PAC ran ads against Bernie Sanders during the Democratic primary.

In September 2016, Correct the Record announced a project called "Trump Leaks". Correct the Record said it would pay anonymous tipsters for unflattering scoops about Donald Trump, including audio and video recordings and internal documents.

On December 31, 2016, the official website was deactivated from its host's servers WPEngine.

Legality
Super PACs, officially known as "independent expenditure-only committees", are political committees that are legally only allowed to make  expenditures that are independent of specific campaigns and which are not coordinated with a candidate or political party. However, Correct the Record says its activities do not fall under this campaign coordination ban restriction, relying on a 2006 Federal Election Commission "Internet exemption" regulation that said that content posted online for free is off limits from regulation. According to FEC rules, online postings do not technically count as campaign expenditures, which allows independent groups to consult with candidates about the content they post on their sites.

References

External links
 Correct the Record on OpenSecrets.org
 Correct the Record on Ballotpedia.org

Hillary Clinton 2016 presidential campaign
United States political action committees
2016 United States presidential campaigns
2015 establishments in the United States